Cosmos is the first half of the second studio album by South Korean rapper, singer-songwriter, and record producer B.I. The half album was released on November 11, 2021, by IOK M, and distributed by Dreamus. It contains 7 songs including the lead single of the same name, "Cosmos", all written and co-composed by B.I. According to B.I, Cosmos is about resistance and love, the feeling that one can only feel at young age. It shows different aspects of youth in the MV and music. Cosmos was preceded by B.I's debut studio album Waterfall, released in June 2021.

Background
On October 18, 2021, B.I announced that his new album will be released on November 11th, exclusively to his fans via his official fan cafe. On October 22, 2021, at midnight KST, 131 Label announced the release of B.I's half album Cosmos with a teaser titled "What Is Your COSMOS?". According to the video’s YouTube description, Cosmos explores “the love that makes me dream about eternity and to give everything without anything in return”. The 7-track half album is all written and composed by B.I, with collaborations from other producers on compositions and arrangements. The album features K-R&B singer Colde (on "Nerd"). A idyllic music video for the title track "Cosmos" was also released alongside the album.

B.I stated in an interview that, "Cosmos is an album like a question about unfading love that makes me dream of eternity and keeps me alive".

Release and promotion
All the promotions before the release were handled through the social media accounts of 131 Label and IOK Music. On October 23, 2021, at midnight KST, B.I's team released a detailed "plan poster" that outlined what fans can expect in the weeks leading up to his comeback. This included two message films, outlining the message of the each of the tracks of the album, excluding the last track "Buddy Buddy". In addition, three message and six lyric concept posters were released. The first message, Keep the Fire Alive, tells the story of passion and power for life. The second message, Uncertainty, the Beauty of Youth, contains the meaning that if youth is a period of burning passion and will for life, it is also uncertain, and the youthful and young love is also a beautiful moment. The third message, We All Live In One's Cosmos, means someone's cosmos while everyone is living, and the cosmos is expressed as the meaning of eternity and the universe.

B.I held a live broadcast via YouTube, 1 hour prior to the new album release.

The first six tracks of the album were released to digital music and streaming platforms on November 11, 2021. The seventh track "Buddy Buddy" was exclusively available on CD only, but was later released digitally to all streaming platforms on December 23, 2021. The album's CDs were made available for pre-order prior to the album release, and were released on November 11, 2021 as well. Three different versions of the CDs are available, Moon, Star and Earth.

Critical reception 

NME granted Cosmos a four stars rating, stating that, "With every release, B.I continues to blaze through his own creative stratosphere, his artistic bravado long taking him light years ahead of his peers. This multifaceted artist may have started his 'Cosmos' expedition in search of love and passion, but his discoveries ended up becoming as vast as its namesake; among them, a desire to be a voice for the youth."

Teen Vogue and MTV News included the title track, "Cosmos", in their respective "Best New Music Friday" and "Bop Shop" selections for the week of November 12, 2021. Highlighting the contrast between its "sweet, romantic lyrics" and its "high-energy melody filled with strong drum beats and retro electric guitar sounds" reminiscent of '80s rock, the latter called the song an "effervescent title track" that "introduces fans to B.I's new world and marks the start of a fun, interesting, and spirited comeback."

Track listing

Charts

Personnel
Credits are adapted from the album's liner notes.

Production
 B.I – executive producer
 Lee Seung-jun – recording
 Stay Tuned – mixing
 Chris Gehringer – mastering

Additional personnel

 Sim Hye-jin – production director
 Oh Su-min – A&R
 Kim Ha-neul – A&R
 Lim Da-hye – content planning
 Jung Ye-jing – content planning
 Hosua Yoh – global A&R
 Yang Jin-woo – gobal A&R
 Nick.K – management
 Kim Woogie – music video director
 Lee Hye-in – track film director
 AFF – live performance film director
 Kimheejune – photography, promotion photography
 Yoon Song-yi – photography
 Narae – album design
 Jung Fwan-wook – styling
 Jang Min-cheol – styling assistant
 Kim So-hee – hair
 Choi Hyeon-sung – hair assistant
 Park So-yeon – hair assistant
 Noh Hang-yeol – make-up
 Cho Soo-bin – make-up assistant
 Park Min-jae – make-up assistant
 Youngbeen – choreography
 Xin Seoul – promotion photography
 Jang Jin-woo – executive adviser
 Kim Sung-tae – executive supervisor

Release history

References

Korean-language albums
2021 albums